This is a list of Boholano by blood and affinity anywhere in the world.

Also named in the list are the late president of the Republic of the Philippines Carlos P. Garcia, Francisco Dagohoy and Datu Sikatuna who are Boholanos.

Heroes
 Francisco Dagohoy of Inabanga, Bohol who led the longest Philippine revolt against the Spaniards
 Tamblot, babaylan or priest to a local diwata (deity) who stirred up a religiously-motivated uprising against the Spaniards
 Datu Sikatuna, Boholano chieftain who was part of the famous blood compact with Miguel Lopez de Legazpi

Arts and Culture
 Napoleon Abueva, Father of Modern Philippine Sculpture, national artist
 Karyapa, first known poet of the Philippines

Scientists and Discoverers
 Czarina Saloma, sociologist
 Caesar Saloma, applied physicist, 9th chancellor of UP-Diliman
 Filemon Cloma, discoverer of Kalayaan Islands
 Tomas Cloma, honorary vice-admiral, father of Philippine Maritime Education, and founder of PMI Colleges.

Public service
 Carlos P. Garcia of Talibon, Bohol - the 8th President of the Philippines
 Jose A. Clarin, senator
 Olegario Clarin, senator
 Juan Torralba, senator
 Ernesto Herrera, senator
 Leoncio Evasco Jr., cabinet secretary
 Ernesto Pernia, secretary and director of NEDA
 Julius Caesar Herrera, Assistant Executive Secretary of the SSS commission in 1985 and then Labor Arbiter of the National Labor Relations commissions - Region VII in 1986, President of (VGLP)Vice Governor's League of the Philippines 3rd term First time in the history in Vice governor's League
 Jane Censoria Cajes, Sangguniang Kabataan National Federation President, 2007-2010
 Edwin Lacierda of Loon, Bohol, the Presidential Spokesperson of President Benigno Aquino III.
 Conrado D. Marapao, governor of the "free" government in World War II.
 Romulo Neri of Loon - executive director of the National Economic and Development Authority (NEDA)
 Virgilio Mendez, former director of NBI

Education
 Cecilio Putong, secretary of Education
 José Abueva, educator, 16th president of University of the Philippines
 Christopher Bernido, educator, Ramon Magsaysay Awardee
 Ma. Victoria Carpio-Bernido, educator

Religion
 Romulo Valles, president of Catholic Bishops' Conference of the Philippines, Fourth Archbishop of the Archdiocese of Davao, fifth Archbishop of the Archdiocese of Zamboanga and Fourth Bishop of the Diocese of Kidapawan.
 Bernardito Auza, Apostolic nuncio to Spain
 Mariano Gaviola y Garces, former Archbishop of Lipa
 Cosme Damian Racines Almedilla, Third Bishop of the Diocese of Butuan.
 Crispin Varquez, current Bishop of Borongan.

Sports
 Lauro Mumar, FIBA World Championship medalist, Philippine National Basketball Hall of Famer
 Bernie Fabiosa, PBA legend, 25 Greatest Players of the PBA, played from 1975-1991 
 Lawrence Mumar, basketball player and coach
 Nonito Donaire of Talibon- four-division world boxing champion
 Simeon Toribio of Carmen - Olympian, athletics
 Reynaldo Bautista, boxer
 Czar Amonsot, boxer
 Mark Magsayo, boxer
 Peter Naron, PBA playerd, drafted 1994
 Arvin Adovo, PBA player, drafted 2001
 Al Francis Tamsi, PBA player, drafted 2016
 Dexter Zamora, PBA player, drafted 2019

Entertainment
 Cesar Montano - actor, director, host
 Yoyoy Villame, singer, king of Filipino novelty songs 
 Luke Mejares, singer
 Giselle Sanchez, actress and comedian
 Sheree Bautista, actress and dancer
 Roberto Amay Bisaya  Reyes, actor
 Rebecca Lusterio, actress
 Rebecca del Rio, actress
 Richelle Angalot, actress
 Maryo J. de los Reyes, film and television director
 Joan Almedilla, Broadway star in New York
 Marco Sison, singer
 Jane De Leon, actress
 Yamyam Gucong, actor and comedian
 Hailee Steinfeld - singer, Hollywood actress (ancestral origins from Panglao, Bohol)
 Vivoree Esclito - actress, singer, television personality

Lists of Filipino people
Boholanos